The Diocese of Morón is a Latin Church ecclesiastical territory or diocese of the Catholic Church in Argentina. It is a suffragan diocese in the ecclesiastical province of the metropolitan Archdiocese of Buenos Aires in Argentina.

Its cathedra is a Minor Basilica : Catedral Basílica Inmaculada Concepción del Buen Viaje, in Morón, Buenos Aires, in the Argentine province of Buenos Aires, capital of the Morón partido, in the Greater Buenos Aires metropolitan area.

History 
 Erected on 11 February 1957 as Diocese of Morón / Moronen(sis) (Latin), on territory split off from Archdiocese of La Plata (not its Metropolitan)
 Lost territories thrice : on 1961.04.10 to establish Diocese of San Martín (also from part of Diocese of San Isidro), on 1969.07.18 to establish Diocese of San Justo (also from part of Diocese of Lomas de Zamora) and on 1997.05.13 to establish Diocese of Merlo–Moreno

Statistics 
As per 2014, it pastorally served 664,000 Catholics (90.7% of 732,000 total) on 130 km2 in 53 parishes with 69 priests (53 diocesan, 16 religious), 30 deacons, 86 lay religious (25 brothers, 61 sisters) and 5 seminarians.

Bishops

Episcopal Ordinaries
 Miguel Raspanti, S.D.B.  (1957.03.13 – retired 1980.01.22), died 1991
 Justo Oscar Laguna (1980.01.22 – retired 2004.11.30), died 2011
 Luis Guillermo Eichhorn (2004.11.30 – retired 2017.06.30), died 2022
 Jorge Vázquez (2017.06.30 – ...)

Coadjutor bishop
Jorge Vázquez (2017)

Auxiliary bishops
Fernando María Bargalló (1994.04.27 – 1997.05.13), appointed Bishop of Merlo-Moreno
Carlos Walter Galán Barry (1981.02.11 – 1991.05.08), appointed Archbishop of La Plata

Other priests of this diocese who became bishops
Gerardo Tomás Farrell, appointed Coadjutor Bishop of Quilmes in 1997
José Antonio Gentico, appointed Auxiliary Bishop of Buenos Aires in 2001
Santiago Olivera, appointed Bishop of Cruz del Eje in 2008
Gabriel Bernardo Barba (priest here, 1989-1997), appointed Bishop of Gregorio de Laferrere in 2013
Oscar Eduardo Miñarro (priest here, 1995-1997), appointed Auxiliary Bishop of Merlo-Moreno in 2016
Fernando Miguel Gil Eisner (priest here, 1983-1997), appointed Bishop of Salto, Uruguay in 2018

See also 
 List of Catholic dioceses in Argentina

References

Sources and external links 
 GCatholic - data for all sections 
 

Roman Catholic dioceses in Argentina
Roman Catholic Ecclesiastical Province of Buenos Aires
Religious organizations established in 1957
Roman Catholic dioceses and prelatures established in the 20th century